Acentrella lapponica is a species of small minnow mayfly in the family Baetidae. It is found in Europe and Northern Asia (excluding China) and North America.

References

Mayflies
Insects described in 1912